Újpest Football Club is a professional football club based in Újpest district of Budapest, Hungary.

Team
Record League victory — 16–0 vs. Nemzeti SC, (22 May 1945)
Record 2nd League victory — 22–0 vs. Postatakarékpénztár, (20 November 1904)
Record away victory — 10–0 vs. Salgótarjáni SE, (21 May 1939) and vs. Budai Barátság, (1 April 1946)
Record League Defeat — 0–9 vs. Törekvés SE, (17 May 1914)

Player
Most League Appearances — 462, Ferenc Szusza (1941–60)
Most League Goals scored —  392, Ferenc Szusza
Most League Goals in a Season — 56, Gyula Zsengellér (1938–39)
Most Goals scored in a Match — 6
Gyula Zsengellér v. Salgótarjáni SE, (11 November 1938)
Gyula Zsengellér v. Salgótarjáni SE (21 May 1939)
Gyula Zsengellér v. Budafoki FC, (27 May 1939)
Lajos Várnai v. Testvériség SE, (22 June 1947)
Ferenc Bene v. Haladás, (21 October 1962)
Most Capped Player — 92, László Fazekas (1968–83)

Attendance
Record League Attendance (Megyeri úti stadion) — 40,000 vs. Ferencvárosi TC (September 18, 1949)
Record League Attendance (Népstadion) — 90,000 vs. Budapest Honvéd (September 10, 1956)
Record League Average Attendance - 27 923 in 1964 season.
Longest unbeaten Run — 31 (League), (30 July 1945 – 17 June 1946)
Most League Goals in a season: — 184 (1945–46)
Most points in a season — 76 (34 games, 1996–97)

References

records
Ujpest
Ujpest